Stefano Zandri (born 4 June 1962), known by his stage name Den Harrow, is an Italian singer and model. The name Den Harrow was conceived by producers Roberto Turatti and Miki Chieregato, who based it on the Italian word denaro (money).

Career
Den Harrow became popular in the late 1980s at the height of the Italo disco genre. He scored several hits during that period; one of his best known songs is "Don't Break My Heart" from 1987.

Revelation
After years of fame and popularity, it was revealed by frontman Stefano Zandri and his producers that Zandri did not actually sing any of the songs credited to Den Harrow; he was essentially a character who lip-synched to vocals recorded by a number of other singers. Furthermore, since they did not consider Zandri's name and origin to be "trendy" enough, producers Turatti and Chieregato concealed Zandri's Italian origin, marketing him as having been born Manuel Stefano Curry in Boston, Massachusetts. This was done so that Polydor Records could market him more easily in the English-speaking world, where Italian-produced music was, at the time, viewed with skepticism.

American vocalist Tom Hooker, also known as Thomas Barbey, who was residing in Italy during the Italo disco era, sang most of the songs for the Den Harrow project, including the 1985–1986 European hit singles "Don't Break My Heart", "Bad Boy", "Catch the Fox", and "Future Brain". Another vocalist, Anthony James from England, was contracted to sing the lead vocals on the Lies album (1988), and also provided the lead vocals on songs like "Holiday Night", "My Time", "You Have a Way". During an interview, Tom Hooker explains why it was decided to be done this way:

Also according to Tom Hooker, Chuck Rolando's voice was used in the early singles "To Meet Me" and "A Taste of Love". Later on, Silver Pozzoli was chosen to do the single "Mad Desire"; however, Hooker provided the vocals for the album releases of "Mad Desire". Although Hooker continued co-writing tracks for Den Harrow project, the producers wanted to use a higher-voiced vocalist for the 1988 album Lies. Hooker says that Zandri did sing on the 1991 Den Harrow single "Ocean".

The 2018 documentary Dons of Disco addresses the controversy surrounding Den Harrow's identity and specifically Tom Hooker's involvement. Through archival footage and interviews with those involved in the "creation" of Den Harrow, both Zandri and Hooker's claims to Den Harrow's authorship are represented.

Den Harrow in the 1990s and 2000s

In 1997, Zandri moved to California to take part in the TV series Sunset Beach. In 2005, he hosted the Italian-language TV show Radio Harrow on the satellite TV channel Match Music. In 2006 and in 2012, he took part in a reality show, the Italian version of Celebrity Survivor which broadcast on Rai 2. In 2007, via his website, Zandri released a new song, "FEDEN - Lo so", written and sung by Zandri and his wife.

Dispute with Tom Hooker
In 2010, Tom Hooker recorded and published on YouTube a press conference-style video in which Hooker, flanked by the co-producer/composer Miki Chieregato, states and demonstrates that he was the vocalist on most of the Den Harrow records, and in which he accuses Zandri of continuing to publicly lip synch to those recordings. He also states that Zandri made threats and insults against Hooker and his family on Facebook for exposing the vocal inauthenticity of the Den Harrow recordings. Hooker asserts that Zandri no longer has permission to publicly lip sync to Den Harrow recordings that use Hooker's voice.

Discography

Studio albums

Compilation albums

Re-worked compilation albums with new songs

Singles

See also
Milli Vanilli, a German-based musical group who achieved fame before also revealing that the "lead singers" also lip-synced.

References

External links 

 
 
 

1962 births
English-language singers from Italy
Italian dance musicians
Italian Italo disco musicians
Living people
Participants in Italian reality television series
Singers from Milan
Ariola Records artists
Polydor Records artists
Musical hoaxes